Panipenem/betamipron is a carbapenem antibiotic marketed by Daiichi Sankyo Co. of Japan. It was launched in 1993, under the brand name Carbenin.

It is a combination in which panipenem is the carbapenem antibiotic and betamipron inhibits renal uptake of panipenem and so reduces its nephrotoxicity (much like the imipenem/cilastatin combination).

References 

Carbapenem antibiotics
Combination antibiotics